Pikesville is a census-designated place (CDP) in Baltimore County, Maryland, United States. Pikesville is just northwest of the Baltimore city limits. It is the northwestern suburb closest to Baltimore.

The population was 30,764 at the 2010 census. The corridor along Interstate 795, which links Pikesville, Owings Mills and Reisterstown to the Baltimore Beltway (Interstate 695), contains one of the larger Jewish populations in Maryland.

Geography
Pikesville is located at  (39.379039, −76.705091).

Demographics

As of the census of 2010, there were 30,764 people and 13,642 households residing in the CDP. The population density was 2,490.8 people per square mile. There were 14,323 housing units. The racial makeup of the CDP was 77.0% White, 14.5% African American, 0.1% Native American, 6.0% Asian, 0.1% Pacific Islander, and 1.6% from two or more races. Hispanic or Latino of any race were 2.7% of the population.

As of the 2000 census, there were 12,747 households, out of which 24.1% had children under the age of 18 living with them, 54.9% were married couples living together, 7.0% had a female householder with no husband present, and 36.1% were non-families. 30.5% of all households were made up of individuals, and 14.9% had someone living alone who was 65 years of age or older. The average household size was 2.25 and the average family size was 2.81.

In the CDP, the population was spread out, with 19.7% under the age of 18, 5.3% from 18 to 24, 24.4% from 25 to 44, 27.0% from 45 to 64, and 23.6% who were 65 years of age or older. The median age was 45 years. For every 100 females, there were 86.0 males. For every 100 females age 18 and over, there were 81.0 males.

The median income for a household in the CDP was $58,598, and the median income for a family was $78,002 (these figures had risen to $73,846 and $100,237 respectively as of a 2007 estimate). Males had a median income of $52,079 versus $37,179 for females. The per capita income for the CDP was $41,035. About 5.0% of families and 6.9% of the population were below the poverty line, including 4.4% of those under age 18 and 11.5% of those age 65 or over.

In 2000, 19.3% of Pikesville residents identified as being of Russian heritage. Virtually all of them are Ashkenazi Jews whose ancestors immigrated from the Russian Empire. In 2000, 3.7% of Pikesville residents identified as being of Ukrainian American heritage. This was the highest percentage of Ukrainian Americans of any place in Maryland. 2% of the city were descended from Eastern European countries other than Russia and Ukraine. The majority of them are of Ashkenazi Jewish ancestry. 8% of Pikesville's residents were German, 7% Polish, 4% Irish, 3% English, and 2% Italian.

Jewish community

In the 19th and early 20th centuries Jewish immigrants to the Baltimore area first formed enclaves in East Baltimore not far from Johns Hopkins Hospital in neighborhoods such as Broadway East, Jonestown, Middle East and Oliver. After World War II, the Jewish community started to move outside of Baltimore City into Pikesville which was a sleepy outpost on a major road that led to Western Maryland. During the Vietnam War, and exacerbated by riots in 1968, many Jewish businesses left northwestern Baltimore following this exodus.

Pikesville (and more recently its neighboring communities to the north, Owings Mills and Reisterstown) have been considered the center of the Baltimore area's Jewish community since the mid-1950’s. Many of the region's largest and most established synagogues and Jewish schools are located in or near Pikesville.

History
Pikesville was named for the American soldier and explorer Zebulon Pike (1779–1813). While there are places named for Pike in many other states, Pikesville, Maryland, is the only contemporary place named "Pikesville" (compare Pikeville, Kentucky).

The (historic) town of Pikesville, incorporated August, 1818, in Barren County, Kentucky, was apparently named for Zebulon Pike, also.  In 1858, the community adopted a new postal name, “Flippin, Kentucky,” to avoid confusion with Pikeville, Kentucky.  “Pike[s]ville Branch” of Indian Creek is the only remaining physical landmark of historic Pikesville, in Kentucky, along with a colorful story of an almost forgotten past.

Education
Pikesville is served by several elementary, middle, and high schools and higher-education facilities:

Public
All public schools in Pikesville are part of the Baltimore County Public Schools system.
 Fort Garrison Elementary School
 Milbrook Elementary
 Bedford Elementary School
 Summit Park Elementary School
 Wellwood International School (elementary)
 Winand Elementary
 Northwest Academy of Health Sciences (Formerly Old Court Middle School)
 Pikesville Middle School
 Sudbrook Magnet Middle School
 Pikesville High School

Independent
 The Park School
 Elementary School of St. Marks
 Beth Tfiloh Dahan Community School
 The Odyssey School
 St. Timothy's School
 Krieger Schechter Day School
  Torah Institute

Higher education
 Ner Israel Rabbinical College
 Maalot Baltimore: Women's Institute of Torah Seminary

Government
The Maryland State Police is headquartered at 1201 Reisterstown Road in the Pikesville CDP.

Transportation

Roads
Baltimore Beltway (I-695)
Milford Mill Road
Mount Wilson Lane
Old Court Road
Park Heights Avenue (MD-129)
Reisterstown Road (MD-140)
Seven Mile Lane
Slade Avenue
Smith Avenue
Stevenson Road
Sudbrook Lane/Road
Brooks Robinson Drive

Public transportation
The Baltimore Metro Subway runs through Pikesville, with two stops in the area, both named for the roads on which they are located: Milford Mill and Old Court.

Notable residents
 Michael H. Shamberg, filmmaker and music video producer (True Faith, Blue Monday), raised in Pikesville.
 Robin Quivers, long-running news anchor and co-host of The Howard Stern Show, was born and raised in Pikesville.
 Sam Barsky, knitting artist

Pikesville in national/international news
Vernon Lee Evans was a key figure in the battle against lethal injection in Maryland and other states. Prior to Maryland's outlawing of capital punishment in 2013, he and Anthony Grandison were on death row for the murders of two clerks at the Warren House Motel (currently a Howard Johnson) in Pikesville in 1983. Governor Martin O'Malley commuted both men's sentences in 2014, along with those of the other two men who were, at the time, on Maryland's death row.

Ziad Jarrah, a suspected terrorist involved in the 9/11 attacks, was pulled over two days earlier for speeding in Pikesville.

References

External links 

 

 
Census-designated places in Baltimore County, Maryland
Census-designated places in Maryland
Jewish communities in the United States
Jews and Judaism in Baltimore County, Maryland
Polish-Jewish culture in Maryland
Russian communities in the United States
Russian-Jewish culture in Maryland
Ukrainian communities in the United States
Ukrainian-Jewish culture in Maryland